Fremantle (formerly FremantleMedia) is a British multinational television production and distribution company based in London. Fremantle takes its name from Fremantle International, acquired by predecessor company All American Television in 1994. Pearson Television was renamed FremantleMedia on 20 August 2001, following the 2000 merger of Pearson Television and Bertelsmann's CLT-UFA to form the RTL Group.

Fremantle owns non-scripted formats, including the British talent competitions Idols (created by Simon Fuller), Got Talent and The X Factor (both created by Simon Cowell), shows which have been sold around the world. Since 1994, Fremantle has distributed American game shows in the US and internationally.

History

Pearson Television (1994–2001)
In 1994, after a bidding war, Pearson plc bought Thames Television and placed it under Pearson Television. In 1995, it acquired Australian company Grundy Television. ACI, a U.S.-based distributor of TV movies, was purchased later that year. In 1996, Pearson Television bought the British production company SelecTV PLC, and merged into it.

Pearson Television announced on 1 October 1997 that it would launch a $373 million cash tender offer for publicly traded U.S. television company All American Communications Inc. On 5 November, Pearson completed its tender offer, and All American was merged into Pearson Television the following year. This acquisition gave Pearson worldwide rights to various game show formats as well as drama series in the U.S. such as Baywatch.

Pearson Television acquired Italian drama production company Mastrofilm on 3 November 1998, and European animation financer and distributor EVA Entertainment on 2 February 1999. In April 2000, Pearson TV decided to take over Smith & Jones' UK production company Talkback Productions.

Fremantle International

The first incarnation of Fremantle, known as Fremantle International was founded in 1952 by Paul Talbot as Fremantle Overseas Radio and Television and later renamed as Fremantle International in 1958,  named after the city in Western Australia. It was involved in the production of television series, movies, and specials from 1964 to 1994 and owned game show formats from Mark Goodson-Bill Todman Productions, Stewart Television, Barry & Enright Productions, Kline and Friends, Hatos-Hall Productions, and Chuck Barris Productions internationally. By the 1980s, Fremantle had become the largest producer of game shows in Europe. In 1989, The Interpublic Group of Companies bought a 49% minority interest in Fremantle International. On 20 May 1991, Interpublic Group increased its ownership stake in Fremantle International to 80%, with Paul Talbot retaining a 20% holding in the company.

Interpublic Group agreed to sell assets of Fremantle International to All American Communications Inc. for $63 million in cash and stock on 7 July 1994. All American acquired Fremantle International in August. Paul Talbot continued to own The Fremantle Corporation, the international distributor of All American's Baywatch and other programs until his death in 2005 and the company's assets was later acquired by Canadian-based Kaleidoscope Entertainment in June 2006. All American Fremantle International managed and distributed Mark Goodson Productions' game show formats worldwide. In 1998, All American Television and All American Fremantle International were renamed Pearson Television North America and Pearson Television Licensing, and operated under those names until being renamed in 2001.

FremantleMedia (2001–2018)

In 2000, German conglomerate Bertelsmann announced that it would form a joint venture between its CLT-UFA group (itself a merger of Luxembourg's CLT and German studio UFA GmbH) with Pearson Television (whose library included former British ITV franchise Thames Television, All American Television—who owned the libraries of Lexington Broadcast Services and game show producers Mark Goodson Productions and Fremantle International, and Australia's Reg Grundy Organisation) to create a multinational media group and content business—eventually known as RTL Group—to consolidate their broadcasting and production activities, and provide a European competitor to American-owned media conglomerates.
The content business would be renamed FremantleMedia in 2001, while Bertelsmann would later increase its stake in RTL Group to achieve majority ownership.

In the mid-2010s, FremantleMedia began to increase its investments into "high-end" scripted dramas to diversify its output. The strategy proved successful for the company, with international dramas having increasingly accounted for more of its overall revenue.

In January 2018, FremantleMedia sold its Kids & Family Entertainment division to Boat Rocker Media.
In July 2018, FremantleMedia North America CEO Jennifer Mullin was named the new CEO of the worldwide company, replacing the outgoing Cecile Frot-Coutaz.

Fremantle (2018–present)
In September 2018, the company changed its public-facing brand to "Fremantle", introducing a new handwritten logo (Fremantle Media remains the company's legal name). Mullin described the logo as a "creative signature" that "[puts] our own unique mark on everything that we do."
On 13 July 2020, Fremantle spun off Storyglass into an independent company within Bertelsmann. On 9 September, Fremantle merged Boundless and Naked Entertainment to form Naked Television.

On 10 May 2022, Fremantle acquired a majority stake in Element Pictures, an Irish film studio and television drama production company known for producing films such as The Guard, Frank, Room, The Lobster, The Favourite, and The Nest and television series such as Normal People and Conversations with Friends, both for Hulu, BBC Three, and RTÉ as well as Red Rock for TV3 (co-produced with All3Media-owned Company Pictures), in addition to owning the Light House Cinema in Dublin and Pálás Cinema in Galway, Irish film video on demand service Volta (named after the first cinema in the Republic of Ireland) and a theatrical distribution arm (Element Pictures Distribution). In November 2022, it was announced Fremantle had acquired a majority stake in the Tel Aviv-based independent production company, Silvio Productions.

Productions

Fremantle is known for its ownership of a number of non-scripted formats, including the talent competitions Idol,  Got Talent, and The X Factor (the latter two with Simon Cowell's Syco Entertainment), and game shows via its ownership of the libraries of U.S. producer Goodson-Todman Productions, Australian producer Reg Grundy, and others, which includes formats such as Family Feud, The Price is Right, and Sale of the Century among others.

Via the Reg Grundy library, Fremantle Australia owns a number of notable Australian dramas and soap operas, including the long-running Neighbours and Prisoner.

Since the mid-2010s, Fremantle has increased its focus on scripted series internationally, having produced or distributed programmes such as American Gods, Beecham House, Charité, Deutschland 83,  Picnic at Hanging Rock, The Rain, The Young Pope, and The Mosquito Coast.

Production offices and labels

Fremantle has production units across its global offices and network of production companies and labels on the ground in over 26 territories.

In the United States, Fremantle's largest production and distribution division, Fremantle North America is based in Burbank, California, and includes a portfolio of companies. Fremantle North America produces and distributes scripted and alternative programs for broadcast and cable networks, syndication, and streaming platforms.

In addition, Fremantle North America owns several other smaller production companies; among these are Thom Beers' Original Productions (responsible for creation and production of numerous reality shows such as Deadliest Catch, Ax Men, and Ice Road Truckers) and Amygdala Music, Leslie Beers' production and composition firm that writes themes, incidental, and featured music for Original Productions shows.

Here are all of the production and/or distribution labels from Fremantle:

References

External links
 Official website
 FremantleMedia's old Website (Pearson Television)
 FremantleMedia's 2nd original website
 FremantleMedia's original Website
 Pearson Television Rebranded as FremantleMedia
 Pearson Television Rebranded as FremantleMedia and Launches New Identity

RTL Group
Television production companies of the United Kingdom
Bertelsmann subsidiaries
Television syndication distributors
Mass media companies established in 1952
British companies established in 1952
Mass media companies based in London